Büdesheim is a municipality in the district of Bitburg-Prüm, in Rhineland-Palatinate, western Germany.

References

External links
 www.buedesheim-eifel.de official website of Büdesheim 
 www.eifeldorf-buedesheim.de private website Büdesheim 

Bitburg-Prüm